Serious and Organised is a British crime drama television series, created by Matt Jones, and broadcast on ITV from 2 January to 6 February 2003. Created as a star vehicle for lead actor Martin Kemp, only one series was commissioned owing to the show not achieving the ratings expected by the network, despite a consistent consolidated viewing audience of between 6-7 million. A total of six episodes were broadcast. The complete series has since been released for streaming on YouTube by production company All3Media on 8 April 2011.

Plot
Jack (Martin Kemp) and Tony Finn (Joe Duttine) are two brothers working together in the same division of the National Serious and Organised Crime Unit. Being the only officers of their kind, they are feared by colleagues and criminals alike. Jack, however, is leading a secret double life — having fallen in love with Tony's wife Rachel (Esther Hall). Forced to put their personal differences aside for the sake of their profession, Jack and Tony investigate the likes of crime families, Triads, gangland killings, extortion and major drug suppliers, all whilst trying to battle with their own demons.

The series begins with the arrival of a new boss, DI Dennis Clifton (Danny Sapani), who replaces the outgoing DI Kitchen (Sidney Livingstone). Clifton immediately makes it clear that he will not stand for any nonsense, and is determined to lead the unit his way. Alongside the Finn brothers are DC Joanna Granger (Emily Bruni) and DC Graham Reid (James Hillier). During the team's second case, it transpires that Reid has secret connections to a gangland murderer, forcing him to go on the run. Granger also finds herself under the spotlight after embarking on an affair with Tony Finn, which subsequently sparks a relationship between Jack Finn and his brother's wife, Rachel. DC Pete Gordon (Mark Leadbetter) is a junior member of the team who also assists the Finn brothers on various cases.

Production
Valerie Lilley was initially announced to play the part of Jeannie Finn, Jack and Tony's mother. However, Lilley pulled out shortly before filming began, forcing every episode to be partially re-written. Her part was not re-cast. Although credited on IMDb, Lilley did not appear in the series.

D.C. Pete Gordon (Mark Leadbetter) is also sometimes erroneously referred to as D.C. Pete Burns, but was never credited as such in the series.

Danny Dyer, Nina Sosanya, Neil Stuke and Amanda Mealing all guest starred in the series.

Cast
 Martin Kemp as D.C. Jack Finn, senior detective
 Joe Duttine as D.C. Tony Finn, senior detective
 Esther Hall as Rachel Finn, Tony's wife
 Danny Sapani as D.I. Dennis Clifton, commanding officer
 Emily Bruni as D.C. Joanna Granger, junior detective
 James Hillier as D.C. Graham Reid, junior detective (Episodes 1—2)
 Mark Leadbetter as D.C. Pete Gordon, junior detective
 Sidney Livingstone as D.I. Kitchen, commanding officer (Episode 1)

Episode list

References

External links

2003 British television series debuts
2003 British television series endings
2000s British drama television series
2000s British crime television series
2000s British television miniseries
English-language television shows
ITV television dramas
Serial drama television series
Television series by All3Media